Amy Denson (born May 3, 1984) was an American professional basketball player. She played for the Sun Devils in NCAA Division I, making her professional debut in Puerto Rico's Montañeras de Morovis. She played throughout Europe and Australia, finally signing with the Sydney Uni Flames in 2010 to play in the Women's National Basketball League. For the 2010–11 year, she was in the WNBL All-Star Five.

Career

College
In college, Denson attended Arizona State University in Tempe, Arizona, playing for the Sun Devils in NCAA Division I.

Arizona State statistics

Source

Puerto Rico
Denson made her debut straight out of college, with Montañeras de Morovis in Puerto Rico's women's basketball league. Despite playing across the globe in Europe and Australia, Denson would return to Montañeras.

Europe
After a two-year stint in Puerto Rico, Denson played for Energa Toruń in Basket Liga Kobiet. After Poland, she then played for Alexandria in Romania's Liga Națională. After a few years in Australia, Denson returned to Europe, playing for Tintos de Toro Caja Rural Zamora in the 2012–13 Liga Femenina de Baloncesto.

Australia
In 2010, Denson signed with the Sydney Uni Flames to play in the Women's National Basketball League, Australia's premier women's league and the strongest league in the southern hemisphere. This would also be the highest level of basketball she would reach in her career. After averaging 18.7 points per game, Denson was awarded a place in the WNBL All-Star Five for 2010–11.

References

1984 births
Living people
American women's basketball players
Arizona State Sun Devils women's basketball players
Basketball players from Oregon
Forwards (basketball)
People from Central Point, Oregon
Sydney Uni Flames players